Dalen is a word that means "the valley" in Norwegian and Swedish. It may refer to:

People
Dalen Lance (born 1983), a South African actor and presenter
Dalen Mmako (born 1996), a South African cricketer
Dalen Terry (born 2002), an American basketball player
Andrea Dalen (born 1992), a Norwegian ice hockey player
Frieda Dalen (1895–1995), a Norwegian teacher 
Gustaf Dalén (1869–1937), a Swedish physicist and businessman
Olav Dalen (born 1985), a Norwegian football player
Sidsel Dalen, a Norwegian journalist and crime fiction writer
Zale Dalen, a Canadian film and television director

Places
Dalen, a village and a former municipality in the northeastern Netherlands
Dalen, Telemark, a village in Tokke municipality in Vestfold og Telemark county, Norway
Dalen Church, a church in Dalen, Telemark
Dalen Hotel, a historic hotel located at Dalen, Telemark
Dalen, the German name for the town of Tomislavgrad in Bosnia and Herzegovina

Sport
Dalen/Krokslätts FF, a football club in Mölndal, Sweden
IBK Dalen, a football club in Umeå, Sweden
HC Dalen, a ice hockey club in Jönköping, Sweden

Other
Dalen Portland, a novel by Kjartan Fløgstad
Dalén light, a light produced from burning of carbide gas

See also
Dirck Dalens the Elder (1600–1676), Dutch painter
Dirk Dalens (1657–1687), Dutch painter
Van Dalen, a list of people whose name is Van Dalen